The Keys is a settlement located south of Bay Bulls, Newfoundland and Labrador. The Keys is now a part of the town of Bay Bulls, as are the communities of Irishtown, Bread and Cheese, and Gunridge.

Spelled "The Quay's"

See also
List of communities in Newfoundland and Labrador

Populated coastal places in Canada
Populated places in Newfoundland and Labrador